Fly Again is the second and final EP by South Korean hip-hop duo, Infinite H. The EP was released on January 26, 2015, in South Korea and it consists of a total of seven tracks, including the promotional track, Pretty.

Background
After releasing video and image teasers in January, the duo released the promotional track, 예뻐 (Pretty) on January 25 prior to the release of the EP. The music video for the song was also released through Woollim Entertainment's official YouTube channel on the same day.

Composition
The EP consists of seven tracks in total with Hoya and Dongwoo participating in the composition of several songs on the EP. The title track, Fly Again is a dub-step song which serves as an intro track. The promotional track, 예뻐 (Pretty) is an upbeat love song about how in love they are with such a beautiful girl that they even hate it when she looks away from them. The third track, 어디안가 (Aren't You Going Somewhere?) is a song with the influence of '80s pop and features vocalist Yang Da Il. The fourth track, 부딪쳐 (Bump) is a song with a R&B rhythm labelmate, Lovelyz's Su-jeong. The fifth track, 바빠서 (Sorry I'm Busy) featuring Swings and Champagne, is a song directed to their haters, with the occasional disses towards their haters in the lyrics. The sixth track, 지킬 앤 하이드 (Jekyll & Hyde) is a song with a Jazz sound about post-breakup feelings and it features singer Taewan. The last track, 니가 미치지 않고서야 (As Long as You're Not Crazy) is a song about catching their lovers cheating and features Sanchez from Phantom.

Music video
The music video for Pretty was released on January 25, 2015. It shows the duo playing a prosecutor and lawyer in a court room interrogating and vying for the attention of the female co-star. The pair recount embarrassing "cases" with the girl that includes the guys getting into a car crash and spilling coffee on their love interest.

Track listing

Charts

Album

Singles

Sales and certifications

Release history

References

External links
 

2015 EPs
Korean-language EPs
Infinite (group) albums
Woollim Entertainment EPs
Kakao M EPs